Yin T. Hsieh (Traditional Chinese: 謝英鐸) (Taiwan, 14 April 1929 – 24 February 2018) was a Taiwanese scientist and agronomist based in the Dominican Republic.

Contributions
Hsieh is considered the "Father of Dominican Rice" for his work on the development of several rice varieties and technologies .

In Taiwan, Doctor Hsieh worked in the development of several rice varieties, including Kaohsiung 22, Kaohsiung 24, Kaohsiung 25, Kaohsiung 27, Kaohsiung 53, Kaohsiung 64, Kaohsiung 136, y Kaohsiung 137.

Hsieh Arrived to the Dominican Republic on December 29, 1965. He focused efforts in genetic improvement of Dominican rice helping to increase the country yield production of the crop. Due to these, and other, efforts, the country now has a strong and well developed rice production system

References

External links
 El Nuevo Diario. Expert calls to invests in agricultural sciences (in Spanish)
 UNAPEC celebrates World Environment day (in Spanish)
 Periódico Hoy. Big farmers learn from small farmers (in Spanish)
 Provincias Dominicanas. Distinguished visitors of the XX century, Bonao, Dominican Republic (in Spanish).
 Diario Libre. Taiwanese embassy to show documentaries (in Spanish). 
 ElCaribe.com. Dominican Republic has been self-sufficient in rice production for six years (in Spanish).
 Perspectiva Ciudadana. The Father of Dominican Rice (in Spanish).
 Periódico Hoy. On Rice history (in Spanish).
 Listín Diario. Fire destroys Dr. Hsieh's 22 years of efforts (in Spanish).

1929 births
2018 deaths
Plant breeding
Agronomists
Agriculture in the Dominican Republic
National Taiwan University alumni
Dominican Republic scientists
Texas A&M University alumni
Recipients of the Order of Christopher Columbus